This is a list of equations, by Wikipedia page under appropriate bands of maths, science and engineering.

Eponymous equations

Mathematics

 Cauchy–Riemann equations
 Chapman–Kolmogorov equation
 Maurer–Cartan equation
 Pell's equation
 Poisson's equation
 Riccati equation
 sine-Gordon equation
 Verhulst equation

Physics

 Ampère's circuital law
 Bernoulli's equation
 Bogoliubov–Born–Green–Kirkwood–Yvon hierarchy of equations
 Bessel's differential equation
 Boltzmann equation
 Borda–Carnot equation
 Burgers' equation
 Darcy–Weisbach equation
 Dirac equation
 Dirac equation in the algebra of physical space
 Dirac–Kähler equation
 Doppler equations
 Drake equation (aka Green Bank equation)
 Einstein's field equations
 Euler equations (fluid dynamics)
 Euler's equations (rigid body dynamics)
 Relativistic Euler equations
 Euler–Lagrange equation
 Faraday's law of induction
 Fokker–Planck equation
 Fresnel equations
 Friedmann equations
 Gauss's law for electricity
 Gauss's law for gravity
 Gauss's law for magnetism
 Gibbs–Helmholtz equation
 Gross–Pitaevskii equation
 Hamilton–Jacobi–Bellman equation
 Helmholtz equation
 Karplus equation
 Kepler's equation
 Kepler's laws of planetary motion
 Kirchhoff's diffraction formula
 Klein–Gordon equation
 Korteweg–de Vries equation
 Landau–Lifshitz–Gilbert equation
 Lane–Emden equation
 Langevin equation
 Levy–Mises equations
 Lindblad equation
 Lorentz equation
 Maxwell's equations
 Maxwell's relations
 Newton's laws of motion
 Navier–Stokes equations
 Reynolds-averaged Navier–Stokes equations
 Prandtl–Reuss equations
 Prony equation
 Rankine–Hugoniot equation
 Roothaan equations
 Saha ionization equation
 Sackur–Tetrode equation
 Samik Hazra equation
 Schrödinger equation
 screened Poisson equation
 Schwinger–Dyson equation
 Sellmeier equation
 Stokes–Einstein relation
 Tsiolkovsky rocket equation
 Van der Waals equation
 Vlasov equation
 Wiener equation

Chemistry

 Arrhenius equation
 Butler–Volmer equation
 Eyring equation
 Henderson–Hasselbalch equation
 Michaelis–Menten equation
 Nernst equation
 Schrödinger equation
 Urey-Bigeleisen-Mayer equation

Biology

 Breeder's equation
 Hardy–Weinberg principle
 Hill equation
 Lotka–Volterra equation
 Michaelis–Menten equation
 Poiseuille equation
 Price equation

Economics

 Black–Scholes equation
 Fisher equation

Technology

 Mansour's equation

Other equations

Mathematics

 Polynomial equation
 Linear equation
 Quadratic equation
 Cubic equation
 Biquadratic equation
 Quartic equation
 Quintic equation
 Sextic equation
 Characteristic equation
 Class equation
 Comparametric equation
 Difference equation
 Matrix difference equation
 Differential equation
 Matrix differential equation
 Ordinary differential equation
 Partial differential equation
 Total differential equation
 Diophantine equation
 Equation
 Modular equation
 Parametric equation
 Replicator equation

Physics

 Advection equation
 Barotropic vorticity equation
 Continuity equation
 Diffusion equation
 Drag equation
 Equation of motion
 Equation of state
 Equation of time
 Heat equation
 Ideal gas equation
 Ideal MHD equations
 Mass–energy equivalence equation
 Primitive equations
 Relativistic wave equations
 Vis-viva equation
 Vorticity equation
 Wave equation

Chemistry

 Chemical equation (aka molecular equation)
 Thermochemical equation

Telecommunications engineering

 Password length equation
 Telegrapher's equations

Lists of equations

Constitutive equation
Laws of science
Defining equation (physical chemistry)
Defining equation (physics)
List of equations in classical mechanics
Table of thermodynamic equations
List of equations in wave theory
List of electromagnetism equations
List of relativistic equations
List of equations in fluid mechanics
List of equations in gravitation
List of photonics equations
List of equations in quantum mechanics
List of equations in nuclear and particle physics

See also

 Variables commonly used in physics
 Equation solving
 Theory of equations

 
 
Equations